Lara González Oteiza (born 14 April 1986) is a Spanish former group rhythmic gymnast. She represented Spain at international competitions.

Biography
Originally from Pamplona, she participated at the 2008 Summer Olympics in Beijing. She also competed at world championships, including at the 2005 and 2007 World Rhythmic Gymnastics Championships. Lara is the sister of rhythmic gymnast Barbara González.

References

External links
Photograph of Lara González, 19 October 2003

1986 births
Living people
Spanish rhythmic gymnasts
Sportspeople from Pamplona
Gymnasts at the 2008 Summer Olympics
Olympic gymnasts of Spain